The 12th Legislative Assembly of Saskatchewan was elected in the Saskatchewan general election held in June 1952. The assembly sat from February 12, 1953, to May 8, 1956. The Co-operative Commonwealth Federation (CCF) led by Tommy Douglas formed the government. The Liberal Party led by Walter Adam Tucker formed the official opposition. After Tucker returned to federal politics in 1953, Asmundur Loptson served as interim Liberal Party leader. Alexander Hamilton McDonald became Liberal Party leader and leader of the opposition in 1955.

Tom Johnston served as speaker for the assembly.

Members of the Assembly 
The following members were elected to the assembly in 1952:

Notes:

Party Standings 

Notes:

By-elections 
By-elections were held to replace members for various reasons:

Notes:

References 

Terms of the Saskatchewan Legislature
1952 establishments in Saskatchewan
1956 disestablishments in Saskatchewan